Vicker is an unincorporated community in Montgomery County, Virginia, United States.

Vicker was named in honor of the Vickers, or Vicars, family of pioneer settlers.

The Hornbarger Store was listed on the National Register of Historic Places in 1989.

References

Unincorporated communities in Montgomery County, Virginia
Unincorporated communities in Virginia